Darren Michael Potter (born 21 December 1984) is a former professional footballer. A midfielder, he made 502 league and cup appearances in a 16-year career in the Premier League and English Football League. Born in England, he won five caps for the Republic of Ireland.

He began his career at Liverpool, making his senior debut in a UEFA Champions League qualifier in August 2004 in the first of his three appearances in that season's competition, which Liverpool would eventually win. He played a total of 17 games for Liverpool, though featured just twice in the Premier League, and spent 2006 on loan at Southampton and Wolverhampton Wanderers. He joined Wolves on a £250,000 transfer in January 2007. A first-team regular in the 2006–07 season, he lost his place the following season and spent the second half of the 2008–09 season on loan at Sheffield Wednesday, before joining the club on a permanent basis for an undisclosed fee in July 2009. Wednesday were relegated out of the Championship in 2010 and Potter left the club by mutual consent in June 2011.

Potter signed with Milton Keynes Dons in June 2011 and would be named as the club's Player of the Year and on the PFA Team of the Year for the 2011–12 season. Promotion out of League One was secured with a second-place finish at the end of his fourth season at the club, though they would be relegated at the end of their maiden season in the Championship. He left the club at the end of the 2016–17 season and joined Rotherham United in June 2017. He suffered an achilles injury six months into his stay at Rotherham, which kept him out of action until the last game of the 2018–19 campaign. He spent the 2019–20 season with Tranmere Rovers and announced his retirement whilst at Altrincham in November 2020.

Club career

Liverpool
Born in Liverpool, Potter grew up in the Scotland Road area of the city. He was released by Everton, the club he supported as a boy, at the age of 15 and spent time in the youth-team at Blackburn Rovers, before being signed to Liverpool in 2001. He turned professional at Liverpool in April 2002.

He made his senior debut for the "Reds" under the stewardship of Rafael Benítez on 10 August 2004, coming on as a late substitute for Steve Finnan in a UEFA Champions League qualifier against Austrian side Grazer AK, playing the last five minutes. He started in the return fixture at Anfield 14 days later, in what ended as a 1–0 defeat though Liverpool advanced with a 2–1 aggregate victory. He made his Premier League debut on 1 February, in a 2–1 win at Charlton Athletic. He also featured in the knockout stages of the UEFA Champions League, coming on as a substitute in the round of 16 home tie against Bayer Leverkusen. Liverpool went on to beat Milan in the final, though only the matchday squad received winner's medals. In total, he made 10 appearances in the 2004–05 season.

The following season, he was involved in pre-season friendlies and the Champions League qualifying rounds but did not feature in the Premier League. He made a brief cameo in the group stages of the Champions League, playing in the final moments of a 0–0 draw with Real Betis. On 26 January, he joined Championship side Southampton on loan for the remainder of the 2005–06 season. He provided an assist for Kenwyne Jones on his "Saints" debut, a 1–0 victory at Leicester City in the FA Cup. He made 12 appearances for George Burley's side, nine starts and three times appearing from the bench.

Wolverhampton Wanderers
On 17 August 2006, Potter returned to the Championship on loan at Wolverhampton Wanderers for the 2006–07 season. He scored his first career goal on 16 January, opening the scoring in a 2–0 victory at Oldham Athletic in the FA Cup. The loan move was made permanent for a £250,000 fee just two days later, with Potter signing a three-and-a-half-year contract. He played 44 games for Wolves during the campaign, helping the team to qualify for the play-offs, though they were eliminated at the semi-final stages by Black Country derby rivals West Bromwich Albion.

His second season with Wolves was less successful though, and manager Mick McCarthy offered him the option of going on the transfer list during the January transfer window to seek more playing time at a new club. Potter rejected the offer and remained at Molineux for the rest of the 2007–08 season, however the club transfer-listed him at its conclusion. After finding no takers for him during the summer transfer window, he was taken off the transfer list and told to fight for his place.

Sheffield Wednesday
He failed to appear for his parent club during the first half of the 2008–09 season, and joined Sheffield Wednesday on loan in January, remaining there until the end of the season. Potter scored for Brian Laws's "Owls" 16 minutes into his debut with a 30-yard drive into the bottom corner in a 4–1 win over Charlton at Hillsborough on 17 January. His loan was made into a permanent deal on 10 July for an undisclosed fee.

Potter scored his first goal of the 2009–10 season on 22 August, in a 4–0 win over newly-promoted Scunthorpe United. His next goal was a left-footed curler in the bottom corner against Blackpool at Hillsborough on 9 February. Potter added to his tally for the season with a volley against Wednesday's fierce rivals Sheffield United in the Steel City derby on 19 April. Wednesday were relegated at the end of the season after new manager Alan Irvine failed to inspire an upturn in form.

The club struggled to adapt to life in League One and brought in Gary Megson as manager in February 2011. They ended the 2010–11 season in 15th-place, with Potter scoring four goals from 40 games. He also received the first red card of his career for a foul on Craig Mackail-Smith in a 5–3 defeat at Peterborough United on 1 February.

Milton Keynes Dons
On 24 June 2011, Potter signed a one-year contract for League One club Milton Keynes Dons after leaving Sheffield Wednesday by mutual consent. He was sent off on his fourth appearance for the Dons, having received two yellow cards during a 1–0 win at Yeovil Town on 16 August. He signed a new two-year contract in April 2012. He played 49 games during the 2011–12 season, scoring three goals, Dons qualified for the play-offs with a fifth-place finish. However they were beaten 3–2 on aggregate by Huddersfield Town in the play-off semi-finals. Potter was named on the PFA Team of the Year and as Milton Keynes Dons Player of the Year and Player's Player of the Year.

The 2012–13 season would see a career high for appearances and goals, as he scored five goals from 55 games, though the club finished two places outside the play-off places. He was limited to 37 appearances at Stadium mk during the 2013–14 campaign. On 21 February 2014, Potter signed a new two-year contract extension. The club secured promotion at the end of the 2014–15 season under the stewardship of Karl Robinson, finishing second to champions Bristol City.

In October 2015, Potter signed a new contract to keep him at the club until 2017, with the option of another 12 months. Dons lasted just one season in the Championship, being relegated after finishing 23rd in the 2015–16 season. Potter battle back from a knee injury to make 38 appearances that season, scoring once in a 5–1 home defeat to Chelsea in the FA Cup. On 24 April 2017, after six seasons, 266 appearances and 12 goals, Milton Keynes Dons announced that Potter would be leaving the club at the end of the 2016–17 season.

Rotherham United
On 14 June 2017, Potter signed a two-year contract with Rotherham United. He was rated as one of manager Paul Warne's best performers during the first half of the 2017–18 season. However in December 2017 he suffered an achilles injury which required two operations, and which kept him out of action until the final match of the 2018–19 season. He left the New York Stadium when his contract expired in June 2019.

Tranmere Rovers
On 28 June 2019, Potter signed a one-year contract with Micky Mellon's Tranmere Rovers. He made 15 appearances in the first half of the 2019–20 season, before Tranmere were relegated into League Two after the season was ended early due to the COVID-19 pandemic in England.

Altrincham
Potter signed a short-term deal with National League club Altrincham on 22 October 2020. He played for the "Reds" in an FA Cup qualifying defeat at AFC Fylde three days later. He left the club in less than a week and later announced his retirement on 17 November to become a coach at Port Vale.

International career
Potter was capped multiple times for Republic of Ireland youth teams – appearing at the 2003 FIFA World Youth Championship – and later made his debut for Ireland's senior team in a friendly against Ecuador in Giants Stadium, New York on 23 May 2007. He was given his debut by Steve Staunton and would win a total of five caps, the last one coming under the caretaker stewardship of Don Givens in a friendly defeat to Brazil at Croke Park in February 2008.

Style of play
Potter was a midfielder with good tackling, leadership and ball retention skills.

Coaching career
Potter left the Port Vale coaching staff to join Potteries derby rivals Stoke City as Lead Youth Development Phase Coach at the U15-U16 age bracket.

Career statistics

Club statistics

International statistics

Honours
Liverpool
UEFA Champions League: 2004–05

Milton Keynes Dons
League One second-place promotion: 2014–15

Individual
PFA Team of the Year: 2011–12 League One
Milton Keynes Dons Player of the Year: 2011–12
Milton Keynes Dons Player's Player of the Year: 2011–12

References

1984 births
Living people
Footballers from Liverpool
English footballers
English people of Irish descent
Republic of Ireland association footballers
Republic of Ireland youth international footballers
Republic of Ireland international footballers
Association football midfielders
Everton F.C. players
Blackburn Rovers F.C. players
Liverpool F.C. players
Southampton F.C. players
Wolverhampton Wanderers F.C. players
Sheffield Wednesday F.C. players
Milton Keynes Dons F.C. players
Rotherham United F.C. players
Tranmere Rovers F.C. players
Altrincham F.C. players
Premier League players
English Football League players
Association football coaches
Port Vale F.C. non-playing staff
Stoke City F.C. non-playing staff